Infanterie-Regiment Nr. 410 was a war-time formation in the German Imperial Army during the First World War. It was created late 1916 and was attached to the 405. Infanterie-Brigade of the 203. Infanterie-Division.

Commanders

Chronology

Additional information

See also
List of Imperial German infantry regiments

Sources

Infantry regiments of the Prussian Army
Military units and formations established in 1916
1916 establishments in Germany